InformAction Productions is a Montreal-based Canadian documentary film production company founded in 1971 by producer Nathalie Barton, directors Jean-Claude Bürger and Gérard Le Chêne. Their films explore major contemporary social and political issues or focus on human stories, art and culture. In 1999 and 2000 producers Ian Quenneville and Ian Oliveri joined the company so as to work with Nathalie Barton.

Documentaries 
Last of the Elephant Men, directed by Daniel Ferguson (2015)
The Price We Pay, directed by Harold Crooks (2014)
Faith in Government, directed by Jon Kalina (2014)
Le Nouveau Visage de Coco, directed by Guy Boutin (2014)
The Grand Challenge, directed by Guy Boutin (2014)
Body Language, directed by Doïna Harap (2013)
Frameworks, directed by Helen Doyle (2013)
Rachel, la star aux pieds nus, directed by Pierre Mignault (2013)
Sand Wars, directed by Denis Delestrac (2013)
Taxi, directed by Wendy Champagne (2013)
Trains of Life, directed by André Melançon (2013)
Waiting for Spring, directed by Marie-Geneviève Chabot (2013)
Walk on the Night Side, directed by Arnaud Bouquet (2012)
East End Forever, directed by Carole Laganière (2011)
Unlikely Treasures, directed by Tally Abecassis
Year One. directed by Carole Laganière
Battle of Wills, directed by Anne Henderson (2009)
Breaking the Silence: Burma's Resistance, directed by Pierre Mignault (2009)
Seeking Refuge, directed by Karen Cho (2009)
Small Wonders, directed by Tally Abecassis (2009)
Chef Thémis, cuisinier sans frontières, directed by Philippe Lavalette (2009)
Born To Be Here, directed by Pierre Mignault (2008)
A Dream for Kabul, directed by Philippe Baylaucq (2008)
Men for Sale, directed by Rodrigue Jean (2008)
Mind in Motion, directed by Philippe Baylaucq (2008)
Afghan Chronicles, directed by Dominic Morissette (2007) 
Shock Waves, directed by Pierre Mignault (2007) 
Solo Senior, directed by Doïna Harap (2006) 
American Fugitive: The Truth About Hassan, directed by Jean-Daniel Lafond (2006) 
City Park, A Little Music for the Soul, directed by Carole Laganière (2006)  
After the Outrage, directed by Olivier Lassu (2005) 
Lifelike, directed by Tally Abecassis (2005) 
Solo Parent, directed by Doïna Harap (2005)  
The Genocide in Me, directed by Araz Artinian (2005) 
The Magic Touch, directed by Carlos Ferrand (2005) 
Alley Cat Paradise, directed by Manon Barbeau (2004) 
East End Kids, directed by Carole Laganière (2004) 
Solo Land, directed by Doïna Harap (2003) 
The Messengers, directed by Helen Doyle (2003) 
The Moon and the Violin, directed by Carole Laganière (2003) 
Salam Iran, A Persian Letter, directed by Jean-Daniel Lafond (2002) 
The Shaman's Apprentice, directed by Stéphane Bégoin (2002) 
Bad Girl, directed by Marielle Nitoslawska (2001) 
Raiders of the Lost Civilizations, directed by Jean-Claude Bürger (2002) 
The Art of Time, directed by Philippe Baylaucq (2000) 
Last Call for Cuba, directed by Jean-Daniel Lafond (1999) 
Creole Connections, directed by Alain d'Aix (1986)

Accolades 
Toronto International Film Festival - TIFF (Top Ten for The Price We Pay)
Jutra Award (best Feature Documentary for En attendant le printemps, best feature documentary finalists for Dans un océan d'images and Vues de l'est)
Gémeaux Awards (Best Culture Documentary for Dans un océan d'images, Best Nature and Sciences Documentary for Le sable, enquête sur une disparition, Best Music for Le Magicien de Kaboul, Diversity Award for Tête de tuque, Best Culture Documentary, Sound, Music for La Griffe magique, Multiculturalism Award for Le Génocide en moi)
Vancouver Film Critics Circle (Best Canadian Documentary Award for The Price We Pay)
Hot Docs (ACDI Award of Best International Development Canadian Documentary for Ondes de choc, Best Medium Length Documentary for Un toit, un violon, la lune and for Vues de l’est, Best Photography - Sound for Visionnaires, Best Political Documentary for Haïti dans tous nos rêves)
Nyon Festival (Jury Award and Cinéma d'Art et d'Essai Award for La Danse avec l'aveugle)
Eko Film Festival of Prague (Jury "Inspiration" Award for Le sable, enquête sur une disparition)
 (Best Documentary Award for Le sable, enquête sur une disparition)
FIGRA France (International Competition for Birmanie l'indomptable, "Autrement Vu" Section for Terre d'Asile)
Vues d'Afrique (Best medium-length Documentary for Rachel, la star aux pieds nus)
 in Burkina Faso (Jury Coup de coeur for Chef Thémis, cuisinier sans frontières)
Toronto Human Rights DocFest (First prize for Terre d'asile)
Staten Island Film Festival (Best International Film for The Genocide in me)
International Short-Length Film Festival in Grenoble (Jury Award for Contre-Censure)...

References

External links 

Mass media companies established in 1971
Film production companies of Canada
Documentary film production companies
Companies based in Montreal
Cinema of Quebec
1971 establishments in Quebec